Shurlee Lesley Swain,  (born 1948) is an Australian social welfare historian, researcher and author. Since August 2017 she has been an Emeritus Professor at the Australian Catholic University (ACU).

Early life and education
Swain was born in 1948 at Natimuk, Victoria. Her mother was a schoolteacher and her father a grocer. The family relocated to Ringwood in Melbourne in 1951, where she completed all her schooling. At the University of Melbourne she completed a Bachelor of Arts with Honours and Diploma of Social Work before completing her Doctor of Philosophy in 1977 on The Victorian Charity Network in the 1890s.

Career
Swain's career as an academic began as a tutor in Australian Studies at Deakin University, before being appointed lecturer at her alma mater, the University of Melbourne, in the late 1980s. From there she moved to the Australian Catholic University (ACU) when it opened in 1991.

In 2011 Swain, together with Professor Cathy Humphreys and Associate Professor Gavan McCarthy, were appointed the three Chief Investigators in the Australia-wide Find and Connect Project — a project to provide history and information about Australian orphanages, children's homes and other institutions.

Outside her university commitments, for the Royal Commission into Institutional Responses to Child Sexual Abuse in 2014, Swain wrote three reports:
"History of Child Protection Legislation"
"History of Institutions providing Out-of-Home Residential Care for Children"
"History of Australian inquiries reviewing institutions providing care for children"

Swain resigned from her position as Professor of Humanities in the School of Arts and Sciences at ACU in 2017 after ten years in that position. ACU celebrated her retirement by hosting a symposium and reception in her honour.

With Judith Smart, Swain is co-editor of the Encyclopedia of Women & Leadership in Twentieth-Century Australia.

Awards and recognition
 Elected Fellow of the Academy of the Social Sciences in Australia (FASSA) in 2007
 Elected Fellow of the Australian Academy of the Humanities (FAHA) in 2017
 Appointed Member of the Order of Australia (AM) in the 2018 Queen's Birthday Honours for "significant service to education, particularly through comparative social history, as an academic, author, and researcher, and to the community".

Selected works

As author

As editor

References

External links

1948 births
Living people
University of Melbourne alumni
Academic staff of the Australian Catholic University
Members of the Order of Australia
Fellows of the Academy of the Social Sciences in Australia
Fellows of the Australian Academy of the Humanities
Australian women historians
20th-century Australian historians
21st-century Australian historians
University of Melbourne women
21st-century Australian women writers
20th-century Australian women writers